Emma Elizabeth Wylie Samuelson MBE known professionally as Emma Samms, (born 28 August 1960) is an English actress and TV host, known for her role as Holly Sutton on the American daytime soap opera General Hospital and as the second actress to play Fallon Carrington Colby on the prime time soap opera Dynasty. She also portrayed the recurring role of Amanda Vardalis on the British soap opera Doctors.

Early life
Samms was raised in the Jewish religion.

Career
Samms first played Holly Sutton Scorpio on the ABC daytime soap opera General Hospital from 1982 to 1985. With Samms choosing to leave the series amicably to go to ABC's Dynasty, her character Holly seemingly perished in a plane crash. On 10 April 1985 Samms appeared in the fifth-season episode "Kidnapped" as Fallon Carrington Colby, a role originated by Pamela Sue Martin in 1981. The character was immediately transplanted into the new Dynasty spin-off The Colbys for two seasons (1985–1987). After the spinoff was cancelled, Samms and the character of Fallon returned to Dynasty in the 23 September 1987 eighth-season premiere "The Siege - Part 1". Samms remained with Dynasty for two seasons until its last episode on 11 May 1989. She later returned for the 1991 miniseries Dynasty: The Reunion.

After the show's run, Samms appeared in several film and television roles. In 1989, Samms made a guest appearance on the sitcom My Two Dads playing Marcy Bradford, the deceased mother of Nicole Bradford (Staci Keanan) and the woman whom the two fathers (Paul Reiser; Greg Evigan) fought over. 

"Fan favorite" Samms had been so popular at General Hospital that Holly was brought back from the dead in January 1992 after a seven-year absence. She stayed in the role until 1993, during this time also playing Holly's lookalike half-sister Paloma Perez, a heroic revolutionary.

In 1995, Samms appeared as the villainous Grayson Louder in the prime time soap opera Models Inc., a spin-off of Melrose Place, both produced by former Dynasty producer Aaron Spelling. She also appeared in the TV movie Treacherous Beauties.

Samms appeared in four episodes of the BBC series Holby City in 2003 and had a recurring run on the BBC daytime series Doctors as Amanda Vardalis in 2005. She made a seven-episode return to General Hospital as Holly in February 2006. After serving as a presenter (alongside General Hospital co-star Tristan Rogers) for the Daytime Emmy Awards on 28 April 2006, she reappeared on General Hospital for a three-week run starting 1 May 2006, and then again on 30 June 2006. She subsequently stepped into the BBC Children in Need reality series Celebrity Scissorhands as a hairdresser from 3–17 November 2006. On 20 September 2007 Samms guested on the long-running ITV series The Bill as drug addict Ella Winstanley.

In August 2009, Samms performed at the Sadler's Wells Theatre in Shall We Dance, a dance revue of musicals by Richard Rodgers, choreographed by Adam Cooper who stars, alongside his wife Sarah Wildor.

In June 2014 Samms was announced as a contestant in  BBC gymnastics show Tumble. She was the second celebrity to be eliminated.

In 2018, Samms performed alongside 26 other celebrities on a new Christmas song, called Rock With Rudolph, which was written and produced by Grahame and Jack Corbyn. The song was released digitally through independent record label Saga Entertainment, on 30 November 2018 in aid of Great Ormond Street Hospital under the artist name The Celebs. The music video debuted exclusively with The Sun on 29 November 2018 and had its first TV showing on Good Morning Britain on 30 November 2018. The song peaked at number two on the iTunes pop chart. Later in 2018, Samms reprised her role as Amanda Vardalis on Doctors.

Samms continues to make appearances on General Hospital. She returned in May 2009, March 2012, August 2013, July 2015, and September 2020.

On 22 August 2022, it was announced that Emma Samms would be returning to General Hospital, reprising the role of Holly Sutton, which she has been playing since 1982. Her episodes were scheduled to start airing in October 2022. According to Deadline, "She’s now set to return to the ABC sudser in October. Fans last saw Holly on September 18, 2020; though presumed dead, Holly was found alive and locked in a cell in Monte Carlo." “I can’t believe that it’s been 40 years since I first appeared on General Hospital and that, once again, I get to play the wonderful character of Holly Sutton,” Samms told Deadline. “No one is more interested in what’s happened to her since we saw her two years ago, being held captive by a mysterious villain, than me!”

Personal life

Samms twice declined offers to appear in Playboy, once during her run on General Hospital and the second during Dynasty. Instead, she appeared on the cover of the February 1988 issue of Inside Sports in a bikini, as well as additional swimsuit shots inside the magazine.

In 1983, Samms and her cousin, film producer Peter Samuelson, co-founded the Starlight Children's Foundation, an organization that helps seriously ill children and their families cope with their pain, fear and isolation through entertainment, education and family activities. The organization was their response to losing Samms's brother and Samuelson's cousin, Jamie, who died at age nine from aplastic anemia.

In 1984 Samms and Tristan Rogers went public with their real-life romance, but the relationship ended around the time she left General Hospital the next year. Engaged to Marvin Hamlisch in the early 1980s, Samms has been married four times: to Bansi Nagji (1991–92), and to Tim Dillon (1994–95). She married John Holloway (1996-2003), and the couple had 2 children. In 2021, Samms married journalist and TV presenter Simon McCoy.

Samms was appointed Member of the Order of the British Empire (MBE) in the 2016 Birthday Honours for services to seriously and terminally ill children.

In April 2018, Samms said that she had been dealing with Bell's palsy, an illness that causes temporary facial paralysis. A month later she sent out an update on Twitter saying "paralysis on my face is 90% better".

She tested positive for COVID-19 during the global pandemic in March 2020 and has since developed long-term complications from her initial infection.

Filmography

Film

Television

References

External links

David Copperfield (illusionist) 
 

Living people
20th-century English actresses
21st-century English actresses
Actresses from London
English film actresses
English soap opera actresses
English television actresses
Jewish English actresses
Members of the Order of the British Empire
People educated at Bedales School
People from Willesden
Emma
1960 births